USNS Shearwater (T-AG-177) was a Shearwater-class miscellaneous auxiliary built during the final months of World War II for the US Army as FS-411 (Design 381 coastal freighter) by Hickinbotham Brothers Shipbuilders. FS-411 was Coast Guard manned operating in the Central and Western Pacific, including Hawaii, Saipan, Tinian, Guam, during the closing days of the war.

She was placed into service by the U.S. Navy from 1964 to 1969 as USNS Shearwater (T-AG-177). After this service, she was transferred back to the U.S. Army.

Operational history as T-AG-177
Shearwater began her naval service as a survey support ship with the Military Sea Transportation Service in May 1964. Operated by a Civil Service crew, she operated in the Atlantic Ocean until mid-February 1969, when she was transferred back to the U.S. Army.

As of 2007, Shearwater was active as a fishing vessel based at Reedville, Virginia. She was retired in 2013 and reefed off the coast of Delaware onto the Del-Jersey-Land Inshore Reef site  in 2015.

References

 
 NavSource Online: Service Ship Photo Archive - T-AG-177 Shearwater

 

Ships of the United States Army
Design 381 coastal freighters
Ships built in Stockton, California
1945 ships
Research vessels of the United States Navy